Test Drive Cycles is a racing video game developed by American studio Xantera and published by Infogrames exclusively for Game Boy Color.

Gameplay
Instead of driving cars like in previous games, the player drives motorcycles.

The game has 24 tracks in 12 real world locations, with ramps to perform killer jumps.

There are 35 licensed motorcycles with multiple upgrade packages and color schemes. Vehicles are classified in Cruisers, Muscle bikes, Sport bikes categories. such as the 1999 Kawasaki ZX12 with 1200cc the fastest bike in the game so far.

Reception

The game received "mixed" reviews according to the review aggregation website GameRankings.

Cancelled console/PC version
Versions were also developed for PlayStation, Dreamcast and PC by the same development team who worked on Test Drive Off-Road 3, but these versions were cancelled in June 2000.

The PlayStation version was to include 30 licensed bikes, 12 tracks and DualShock controller support with the same applying to the Dreamcast version which would support a Jump Pak. The Microsoft Windows version would also include hidden shortcuts.

References

2000 video games
Cancelled Dreamcast games
Cancelled PlayStation (console) games
Cancelled Windows games
Game Boy Color games
Game Boy Color-only games
Infogrames games
Multiplayer and single-player video games
North America-exclusive video games
Cycles
Video games about police officers
Video games developed in the United States
Xantera games